Darius Jerome Holland (born November 10, 1973, in Petersburg, Virginia) is a former American football defensive tackle who played ten seasons in the National Football League. He went to Mayfield High School in Las Cruces, New Mexico and the University of Colorado at Boulder. His nickname with the Packers was 'Dirty D'.  

Currently serving in the Colorado Army National Guard as a chaplain. Holland recently attended the Chaplain Basic Officer Leadership Course at Fort Jackson, South Carolina. While there, his 4th Platoon classmates("FOUR IS MORE") nicknamed him "Tower."

1973 births
Living people
Sportspeople from Petersburg, Virginia
American football defensive tackles
Colorado Buffaloes football players
Green Bay Packers players
Detroit Lions players
Kansas City Chiefs players
Minnesota Vikings players
Players of American football from Virginia
Cleveland Browns players
Denver Broncos players